Jacopo Gaddi (c. 1600 - after 1658) was an Italian Neolatin and Italian writer from Florence.

Biography 
Born to a wealthy noble family, Gaddi was well known in Florence and was in correspondence with numerous figures outside his birthplace, including cardinals of the Roman curia, the painter Cristofano Allori, and, during his sojourn in Florence, English writer John Milton.

In 1628 he published a volume of Latin Poemata. Between 1636 and 1637 he published several works in Italian and Latin, including Elogia, Adlocutiones, and some short historical essays and poems. In two folios in 1648 and 1649 Gaddi published his most ambitious work, De Scriptoribus non-Ecclesiasticis, Graecis, Latinis, Italicis.

Gaddi was a member of the Florentine Academy (from 1620) and the host of his own Svogliati ("Will-less"), a literary group that met at its peak around 1638 in his home on the Piazza Madonna, where he kept a distinguished library and gallery of paintings.

Example
Gaddi was fond of turning historical minutiae into short poems, as in this Latin example, De Nerio II et Antonio II Acciaiolis fratribus ducibus Athenarum, which celebrates the co-rule in Athens of the two Florentine brothers Nerio II and Antonio II Acciaioli:
Nobile par fratrum, Graecos Dux rexit uterque
Non simul, alterno tempore sceptra ferens.
Gesserat haec Nerius, quo pulso Antonius ardens
Rursus at extincto fratre gerit Nerius.
Nimium Pollux et Castor in urbe fuissent,
Si fratrum illis gratia sanctus amor.

References
Masson, David (1859). The Life of John Milton. Boston: Gold and Lincoln.
Setton, Kenneth M. (1975). Catalan Domination of Athens 1311–1380. London: Variorum.

External links 
 

1600s births
1650s deaths
17th-century Italian writers
17th-century Italian male writers
Writers from Florence
New Latin-language poets
17th-century Latin-language writers
Jacopo